Tolazoline is a non-selective competitive α-adrenergic receptor antagonist. It is a vasodilator that is used to treat spasms of peripheral blood vessels (as in acrocyanosis). It has also been used (in conjunction with sodium nitroprusside) successfully as an antidote to reverse the severe peripheral vasoconstriction which can occur as a result of overdose with certain 5-HT2A agonist drugs such as 25I-NBOMe, DOB and Bromodragonfly (prolonged severe vasoconstriction can lead to gangrene if untreated).

It is however most commonly used in veterinary medicine, to reverse xylazine-induced sedation.

References

Alpha-1 blockers
Alpha-2 blockers
Disulfiram-like drugs
Imidazolines
Vasodilators
Veterinary drugs